The KDE Software Compilation (KDE SC) was an umbrella term for the desktop environment plus a range of included applications produced by KDE. From its 1.0 release in July 1998 until the release of version 4.4 in February 2010, the Software Compilation was simply known as KDE, which stood for K Desktop Environment until the rebrand. The then called KDE SC was used from 4.4 onward until the final release 4.14 in July 2014. It consisted of the KDE Plasma 4 desktop and those KDE applications, whose development teams chose to follow the Software Compilation's release schedule. After that, the KDE SC was split into three separate product entities: KDE Plasma, KDE Frameworks and KDE Applications, each with their own independent release schedules.

History

Origins
KDE was founded in 1996 by Matthias Ettrich, who was then a student at the University of Tübingen. At the time, he was troubled by certain aspects of the Unix desktop. Among his qualms was that none of the applications looked, felt, or worked alike. He proposed the formation of not only a set of applications, but, rather, a desktop environment, in which users could expect things to look, feel and work consistently. He also wanted to make this desktop easy to use; one of his complaints with desktop applications of the time was that his girlfriend could not use them. His initial Usenet post spurred a lot of interest, and the KDE project was born.

Ettrich chose to use Trolltech's Qt framework for the KDE project. Other programmers quickly started developing KDE/Qt applications, and by early 1997, a few applications were being released.

First series

On 12 July 1998, K Desktop Environment 1.0 was released. In November 1998, the Qt toolkit was dual-licensed under the free/open source Q Public License (QPL) and a proprietary license for proprietary software developers. Debate continued about compatibility with the GNU General Public License (GPL), so in September 2000, Trolltech made the Unix version of the Qt libraries available under the GPL, in addition to the QPL. Trolltech continued to require licenses for developing proprietary software with Qt. The core libraries of KDE are collectively licensed under the GNU LGPL, but the only way for proprietary software to make use of them was to be developed under the terms of the Qt proprietary license.

Second  series

Beginning 23 October 2000, the second series of releases, K Desktop Environment 2, introduced significant technological improvements. These included DCOP (Desktop COmmunication Protocol), KIO (an application I/O library), KParts (a component object model, which allows an application to embed another within itself), and KHTML (an HTML rendering and drawing engine).

Third series

The third series was much larger than previous series, consisting of six major releases starting on 3 April 2002. The API changes between K Desktop Environment 2 and K Desktop Environment 3 were comparatively minor, meaning that the KDE 3 can be seen as largely a continuation of the K Desktop Environment 2 series. All releases of K Desktop Environment 3 were built upon Qt 3, which was only released under the GPL for Linux and Unix-like operating systems, including Mac OS X. It is marked stable running on Mac OS X  since 2008. Unlike KDE SC 4, however, it requires an X11 server to operate.  In 2002, members of the KDE on Cygwin project began porting the GPL licensed Qt/X11 code base to Windows.

Fourth series

KDE Software Compilation 4, first released on 11 January 2008, is based on Qt 4, which is also released under the GPL for Windows and Mac OS X. Therefore, KDE SC 4 applications can be compiled and run natively on these operating systems as well. KDE Software Compilation 4 on Mac OS X is currently considered beta, while on Windows it is not in the final state, so applications can be unsuitable for day to day use.

KDE SC 4 includes many new technologies and technical changes. The centerpiece is a redesigned desktop and panels collectively called Plasma, which replaces Kicker, KDesktop, and SuperKaramba by integrating their functionality into one piece of technology; Plasma is intended to be more configurable for those wanting to update the decades-old desktop metaphor. There are a number of new frameworks, including Phonon (a new multimedia interface making KDE independent of any one specific media backend) Solid (an API for network and portable devices), and Decibel (a new communication framework to integrate all communication protocols into the desktop). Also featured is a metadata and search framework, incorporating Strigi as a full-text file indexing service, and NEPOMUK with KDE integration.

Starting with Qt 4.5, Qt was also made available under the LGPL version 2.1, a major step for KDE adoption in corporate and proprietary environments, as the LGPL permits proprietary applications to link to libraries licensed under the LGPL.

Post-fourth series 

As of August 2014, KDE no longer provides synchronized releases of the entire software compilation; instead the software is split into three parts:
 KDE Frameworks 5, a collection of libraries and software frameworks (5.0 released on July 7, 2014, and new major releases are made monthly)
 KDE Plasma 5, a desktop environment (5.0 released on July 15, 2014, and new major releases are made every three months)
 KDE Applications, a bundle of applications and supporting libraries (14.12 was the first version incorporating Frameworks 5 based applications, and introduced date-based version numbers).
Major changes include a move from Qt 4 to Qt 5, support for the next-generation display server protocol Wayland, support for the next-generation rendering API Vulkan and modularization of the KDE core libraries. Initial releases of Frameworks 5 and Plasma 5 were made available in July 2014.

Development

Source code
KDE SC releases are made to the KDE FTP server in the form of source code with configure scripts, which are compiled by operating system vendors and integrated with the rest of their systems before distribution. Most vendors use only stable and tested versions of KDE SC, providing it in the form of easily installable, pre-compiled packages. The source code of every stable and development version of KDE SC is stored in the KDE source code repository, using Git. KDE Platform is licensed under the LGPL, BSD license, MIT license, or X11 license. Applications also allow GPL. Documentation also allow FDL. CMake modules must be licensed under the BSD licence.

Major releases
Major releases are releases that begin a series (version number X.0). These releases are allowed to break binary compatibility with the predecessor, or to put it differently, all following releases (X.1, X.2, ...) will guarantee binary portability (API & ABI). This means, for instance, that software that was developed for KDE 3.0 will work on all (future) KDE 3 releases; however, an application developed for KDE 2 is not guaranteed to be able to make use of the KDE 3 libraries. KDE major version numbers follow the Qt release cycle, meaning that KDE SC 4 is based on Qt 4, while KDE 3 was based on Qt 3.

Qt 5.0 was released 19 December 2012, Qt 5.2 12 December 2013. And for example KDE Frameworks 5.21.0 requires Qt >= 5.4, and no longer supports Qt 5.3 (cf. Qt version history).

Standard releases
There are two main types of standard releases: Feature releases and bugfix releases.

Feature releases have two version numbers, for example 3.5 and contain new features. As soon as a feature release is ready and announced, work on the next feature release starts. A feature release needs several months to be finished and many bugs that are fixed during this time are backported to the stable branch, meaning that these fixes are incorporated into the last stable release by bugfix releases. During the KDE SC 4 series, KDE SC had a feature release roughly every six months. Since the split, KDE Plasma releases a new feature version roughly every 3–4 months.

Bugfix releases have three version numbers, e.g. KDE 1.1.1, and focus on fixing bugs, minor glitches, and making small usability improvements. Bugfix releases in general do not allow new features, although some releases include small enhancements. A shortened release schedule is used. Starting with the KDE SC 4 series, KDE SC has a maintenance release roughly every month, except during the month of a feature release, while with Plasma 5, bugfix releases tend to happen even shorter like 2–3 weeks.

Release cycle

The KDE team releases new versions on a regular basis.

Lines of Code 
 KDE 1.0 had  LoC.
 KDE 4.3 had  LoC.

Implementation 
Most KDE software uses Qt which runs on most Unix and Unix-like systems (including Mac OS X), Android and Microsoft Windows.
 CMake serves as the build tool. This allows KDE to support a wider range of platforms, including Windows.
GNU gettext is used for translation. Doxygen is used to generate api documentation.

Overview

 KDE Software Compilation: KDE Software Compilation (KDE SC) is the coordinated releases of new software versions, gathering elements from the previous components to build an integrated core of software. The KDE SC is not a product as a single entity.
 Calligra Suite: Integrated office suite.
 KDEWebdev: Web development tools.
 KDE-Extragear: Extragear is a collection of applications associated with KDE. Those applications are not part the official software compilation, but they are still part of the project.
 KDE-Playground: This package contains pre-release and unstable software. It is a place for applications to mature.

Packages

The Software Compilation consists of the following packages:

 KDE-Libs: A collection of libraries that provides frameworks and functionality for developers.
 KDE-Base: The base set of files, libraries and programs needed by the Software Compilation. KDE-Base is divided into three parts:
 Applications: Containing the applications that form the KDE desktop, like Konqueror, Dolphin, KWrite, and Konsole.
 Runtime: Applications required by KDE apps to function properly at runtime.
 Workspace: Provides the graphical environments.
 KDE-Plasma-Addons: Additional Plasma widgets.
 KDE-Network
 KDE-Pim
 KDE-Graphics
 KDE-Multimedia
 Phonon
 KDE-Accessibility: Accessibility applications.
 KDE-Utilities
 KDE-Edu
 KDE-Games
 KDE-Toys
 KDE-Artwork: Additional icons, styles, etc.
 KDE-Admin
 KDE-SDK
 KDE-Bindings

Base technologies
 KHTML – HTML rendering engine, forked into WebKit in 2004
 KJS  JavaScript engine
 KIO – Extensible network-transparent file access
 Kiosk – Allows disabling features within KDE to create a more controlled environment
 KParts – Lightweight in-process graphical component framework
 KWin – Window manager
 XMLGUI – Allows defining UI elements, such as menus and toolbars via XML files
 Phonon – Multimedia framework
 Plasma – Desktop and panel widget engine
 Solid – Device integration framework
 Sonnet – Spell checker
 ThreadWeaver – Library to use multiprocessor systems more effectively

Applications

Major applications by KDE Software Compilation include:

 Ark – Archiving tool
 Dragon Player – Media player.
 Dolphin – File manager
 Falkon - Web browser
 Gwenview – Image viewer
 Kate / KWrite – Text editor
 Konsole – Terminal emulator
 Kontact – Personal information manager featuring an e-mail client, a news client, a feed aggregator, to-do lists, etc.
 Konqueror – Web browser and file manager
 Kopete – Instant messaging client
 KRDC – a remote desktop client. Both the Virtual Network Computing (VNC) and Remote Desktop Protocol (RDP) protocols are supported, so Unix-like and Windows PC can be accessed using this software. As part of the GSoC, project developers helped make Libvncserver compile on Windows platforms, allowing for a port to Windows.

Licensing 
In November 1998, the Qt framework was dual-licensed under the free and open-source Q Public License (QPL) and a commercial license for proprietary software developers. The same year, the KDE Free Qt foundation was created which guarantees that Qt would fall under a variant of the very liberal BSD license should Trolltech cease to exist or no free version of Qt be released during 12 months.

Debate continued about compatibility with the GNU General Public License (GPL), hence in September 2000 Trolltech made the Unix version of the Qt libraries available under the GPL in addition to the QPL which eliminated the concerns of the Free Software Foundation. Trolltech continued to require licenses for developing proprietary software with Qt. The core libraries of KDE are collectively licensed under the GNU LGPL but the only way for proprietary software to make use of them was to be developed under the terms of the Qt proprietary license.

Starting with Qt 4.5, Qt was also made available under the LGPL version 2.1, now allowing proprietary applications to legally use the open source Qt version.

See also
 KDE Platform
 Comparison of X Window System desktop environments

References

External links

The KDE website
KDE.News, news announcements
KDE community forums, the official forum board
Planet KDE, blog aggregate
KDE wikis
KDE Localization
KDE-Apps, KDE and Qt software repository
KDE-Look
KDE-Files

 
1998 software
Free desktop environments
KDE software
Unix windowing system-related software
Utilities for Linux
Utilities for macOS
Utilities for Windows